West Virginia Route 618 is an east–west state highway located almost entirely in Parkersburg, West Virginia. The route follows the former path of U.S. Route 50 through downtown Parkersburg. It was created when US 50 was realigned onto a bypass of Parkersburg constructed as part of an upgrade of Corridor D. The designation is meant as a continuation of Ohio's State Route 618, though that route turns North at the Parkersburg-Belpre Bridge before it would actually meet West Virginia Route 618.

The western terminus of WV 618 is at the Ohio state line on the Parkersburg-Belpre Bridge. The eastern terminus is at an interchange with US 50 just east of Parkersburg.

Major intersections

References

618
Transportation in Wood County, West Virginia
U.S. Route 50